Toni Leinonen (born 8 November 1991) is a Finnish ice hockey player. He is currently playing with HIFK in the Finnish Liiga.

Leinonen made his SM-liiga debut playing with HIFK during the 2011–12 season.

References

External links

1991 births
Living people
Finnish ice hockey forwards
HIFK (ice hockey) players
Ice hockey people from Helsinki